Omphile Abel Ramela (born 14 March 1988) is a South African  cricketer. A left-handed batsman and left-arm orthodox spin bowler, he made his first-class debut for Gauteng in December 2007 before joining Boland the following month. He also represented the Cape Cobras on several occasions between 2009 and 2010.  The 2014–15 season was his breakthrough year. He finished as the Cobras' top run-scorer in the first-class competition with 724 runs at 48.26, which included a double hundred. He was included in the Western Province cricket team squad for the 2015 Africa T20 Cup.

In September 2017, he played his 100th first-class match, when he played for Highveld Lions against Warriors in the 2017–18 Sunfoil Series. In June 2018, he was named in the squad for the Highveld Lions team for the 2018–19 season.

References

External links
Omphile Ramela profile at CricketArchive

1988 births
Living people
Sportspeople from Soweto
South African cricketers
Gauteng cricketers
Boland cricketers
Cape Cobras cricketers
Lions cricketers